Ensemble Musica Ficta was an Italian early-music ensemble active in the late 1980s and early 1990s. The group consisted of Bruno Ré, Paolo Capirci, Fabio Menditto, Federico Marincola, Andrea Damiani, with tenor Marco Beasley.

Discography
 Musique Baroque À Naples : Emanuele Barbella, Gaetano Latilla, Francesco Mancini, G.-C. Rubino Cantata « Lena ». G.-B. Porsile: Cantata sopra l'arcicalascione. Marco Beasley, Ensemble Musica Ficta. Pierre Verany 1989

References

Early music groups